City Park Golf Course is a public golf course in Baton Rouge, Louisiana and was the first public golf course and the city's only public course until the mid-1950s. The short, 34-par, nine-hole course was completed in 1926 and officially opened in 1928.

The historic  area comprising the golf course, the clubhouse and the old pump house, was listed on the National Register of Historic Places in 2002.

See also
National Register of Historic Places listings in East Baton Rouge Parish, Louisiana

References

External links
City Park Golf Course, at National Park Service

Buildings and structures in Baton Rouge, Louisiana
Golf clubs and courses in Louisiana
Sports venues in Baton Rouge, Louisiana
Tourist attractions in Baton Rouge, Louisiana
Historic districts on the National Register of Historic Places in Louisiana
National Register of Historic Places in Baton Rouge, Louisiana
Event venues on the National Register of Historic Places in Louisiana
Golf clubs and courses on the National Register of Historic Places
1928 establishments in Louisiana